The 1998–99 Czech Cup was the sixth season of the annual football knock-out tournament of the Czech Republic. Winners Slavia Prague qualified for the 1999–2000 UEFA Cup.

Teams

Preliminary round
36 teams took part in the preliminary round.

|}

Round 1
78 teams entered the competition at this stage. Along with the 18 winners from the preliminary round, these teams played 48 matches to qualify for the second round.

|}

Round 2

|}

Round 3

|}

Round 4
The fourth round was played on 10 and 17 March 1999.

|}

Quarterfinals
The quarterfinals were played on 14 April 1999.

|}

Semifinals
The semifinals were played on 4 and 6 May 1999.

|}

Final

See also
 1998–99 Czech First League
 1998–99 Czech 2. Liga

References

External links
 Official site 
 Czech Republic Cup 1998/99 at RSSSF.com

1998–99
1998–99 domestic association football cups
Cup